David Barry Thwaites (born 16 June 1976) is a British actor and producer. In 1989, aged 13, he appeared as Eustace Scrubb in the BBC's adaptation of The Voyage of the Dawn Treader. A year later he reprised this role in The Silver Chair (1990). Now living in Los Angeles, he is a producer and served as executive producer on All the King's Men, License to Wed and Black Swan, and producer on Miss Potter.

Filmography

Film

Television

References

External links

1976 births
Living people
British male television actors
British male film actors
British film producers